The A-Ma Temple is a temple to the Chinese sea-goddess Mazu located in São Lourenço, Macau, China. Built in 1488, the temple is one of the oldest in Macau and thought to be the settlement's namesake.

History

The name Macau was thought to be derived from the name of the temple. It is said that when the Portuguese sailors landed at the coast just outside the temple and asked the name of the place, the natives replied Maa-gok or A-maa-gok  of the Mother"). The Portuguese then named the peninsula "Macau". The temple was well described in ancient Chinese texts, as well as represented in paintings, related to Macao. It is also one of the first scenes photographed in Macao.

In 2005, the temple became one of the designated sites of the Historic Centre of Macau, a UNESCO World Heritage Site.

Architecture
The temple consists of six main parts: Gate Pavilion, the Memorial Arch, the Prayer Hall, the Hall of Benevolence (the oldest part of the temple), the Hall of Guanyin, Zhengjiao Chanlin - Buddhist Pavilion.

Gallery

See also 

 Kun Iam Temple, built in 1627
 Tam Kung Temple (Macau), built in 1862
 Na Tcha Temple, built in 1888
 Sam Kai Vui Kun
 Tin Hau temples in Hong Kong
 Qianliyan & Shunfeng'er
 Religion in Macau
 List of historic buildings and structures in Macau

References

Religious buildings and structures completed in 1488
Historic Centre of Macau
Macau Peninsula
Buddhist temples in Macau
Landmarks in Macau
Mazu temples
1488 establishments in Asia
15th-century establishments in China
15th-century Buddhist temples